The 1923–24 North Carolina Tar Heels men's basketball team (variously "North Carolina", "Carolina" or "Tar Heels") was the fourteenth varsity college basketball team to represent the University of North Carolina (UNC) as a part of the Southern Conference (SoCon) for the NCAA season. The team went undefeated, and the season was the first played in the Tin Can. The head coach was Norman Shepard, coaching in his first and only season with the Tar Heels. Their fast play and defense during the conference tournament earned them the nickname the "White Phantoms", used as an alternative nickname for the Tar Heels into the 1940s.  

The Tar Heels by winning the SoCon tournament were named Southern champions, and were retroactively named national champions. North Carolina has one of the most prestigious college basketball programs, with their first official national championship was in 1957. The 1924 team is thus one of the school's first great teams, when the nationally prominent athletic schools were in the northeast or midwest rather than the south.

All of the team's players were from North Carolina. The team's high scorer was forward Jack Cobb, known as "Mr. Basketball" and the earliest of eight Tar Heels basketball players who have had their jersey retired. The team also featured All-American Cartwright Carmichael, brother of William for whom the Carmichael Arena is named. Others stars included pivot man Bill Dodderer, and guard and three-sport athlete Monk McDonald, considered the best all-around athlete to ever attend UNC. The team's captain was forward Winton Green.

Before the season
This season, for the first time, each player who was fouled was required to shoot their own free throws. It used to be a shooter from among the players on the court was designated by each team as the person to take all the free throws. In these early days of the sport, there was a "running guard" who dribbled the ball up the court and passed or attacked the basket, like a point or combo guard. There was also a "stationary guard" who made long shots and hung back on defense before there was the rule of backcourt violations. Nobody on the UNC team was taller than 6 feet 4 inches, which in those days was considered exceptionally large.

The Tar Heels had played the previous two seasons without a coach.  The Tar Heel wrote that "If Carolina continues to lead the South in this branch of athletics, a capable coach will have to be employed." On January 16, 1923, it was announced that Graduate Manager of Athletics Charles T. Woollen tapped current law student and Freshman football and basketball coach Norman Shepard to become head coach of the varsity basketball team. Shepard had turned down the opportunity to coach the varsity team prior to their previous season because he felt he was busy coaching the Freshman teams already and was completing his Bachelor of Sciences degree in Commerce. Shepard had played Freshman football and basketball at Carolina in 1919 then left the school for Davidson College where he continued to be an athlete. Shepard had a brief stint in minor league baseball and attended the University of Illinois' coaching school led by football coach Robert Zuppke. After taking the position, Shepard stated: "I hadn't intended to stay in coaching."

Prior to the season, practice was being held three times a week. Expectations were high due to the performance of the team the previous two years, winning the Southern Conference tournament in 1922 and going undefeated in the 1922–23 regular season, only to lose in the tournament due to fatigue and illness. The student-run newspaper, The Tar Heel published a pre-season article where an author wrote: "Carolina has without a doubt the chance of her life to set fire to this neck of the woods during the coming season." Seniors Cartwright Carmichael, Monk McDonald, and Winton Green were cited as being among the best players in the South. Carmichael last season was retroactively selected All-American, the earliest Tar Heel to be selected such for any sport. 

The Charlotte Observer wrote that Winton Green, Jack Cobb, and Jimmy Poole were the best looking forwards on the team in their season preview. The writer also expressed belief that the bench for this team was much deeper than that of the 1921–22 conference tournament champions. Poole weighed 120 pounds but was fast and could pass well. Jack Cobb and Billy Devin got promoted to varsity from the previous season's Freshman team. Cobb quickly became known as "Mr. Basketball" on campus. Cobb was versatile on the court and able to shoot, rebound, and pass effectively. Bill Dodderer, star of the 1921 Freshman team, returned to school after a season's absence and got placed on the varsity.

Winton Green was named captain for the team for the 1923–24 season. Monk McDonald had been captain last season, and Carmichael two seasons ago. Guard Carl Mahler who played in the previous season, did not return to school and thus was not a part of the team. Sam McDonald was announced to be returning in early December and thought to be the one to replace Mahler's guard spot, but later did not participate. Monk McDonald was also a medical student, who did not participate in practices due to schoolwork, and was not expected to be on the court until after Christmas. The only reserve not expected to return was Thomas Graham.

Coach Shepard later recalled, "That 1924 team was characterized by quickness and speed...It was a very, very fast team, and we used the fast break effectively...I had inherited a very good group of boys from the team before...Carmichael and Dodderer were exceptionally good...Carmichael and Cobb were so fast and quick with their faking and feinting and breaking, and Carmichael could drive to the basket with unbelievable speed and hold himself in the air for a long time, like he was suspended."

Roster

Staff
Head coach: Norm Shepard
Manager: Bretney Smith

Depth chart

Starters

Substitutes

After Green's injury in the Maryland game, Devin took his spot in the starting five.

Schedule 

|+1923–24 North Carolina Tar Heels
|-
!colspan=9 style="background:#56A0D3; color:#FFFFFF;"| Regular season

|-
!colspan=9 style="background:#56A0D3; color:#FFFFFF;"| Southern Conference tournament

Season summary 

The Charlotte Observer felt Carolina's schedule was "exceptionally hard" and pointed to the Mercer game being a tough one after Christmas break since they were runner's up in the Southern Intercollegiate Athletic Association tournament two seasons ago.

The latter portion of the schedule was revised and announced on January 8, 1924. The alterations mainly involved date changes with games like the Mercer game being moved from January 9 to the 8th, the Washington & Lee and Virginia games swapped dates, and the Durham Elks game that was scheduled for January 4 was pushed back to January 22nd. In addition, there were five open dates revealed. The schedule, as in years past, featured a northern tour that will go through the District of Columbia, Maryland, and Virginia.

UNC beat Mercer 35 to 23. "Two thousand spectators, well wrapped in overcoats, shivered away...and saw the "Tin Can" christened with a victory." Cobb scored 14, and Mercer star George Harmon was held to just one field goal. Consuello Smith led Mercer scorers with 8.

Guilford was beaten 50 to 22. Cobb made 10 field goals and the entire Guilford team made 9. All of Carmichael, Cobb, and Dodderer were used at center.

Durham Elks was beaten 49 to 23. The scored was tied 18 to 18 at the end of the first half. UNC outscored Durham Elks 31 to 5 in the second half.

During the Elon game, Cartwright Carmichael was shifted to guard and Bill Dodderer took over at center. What followed was the season's biggest win, 60 to 13. The first half ended 33 to 3. Cobb led scorers with 20. Green had 17. Carmichael had 10 and McDonald had 9.

In the game with Maryland on February 5, captain Green received a Charley-horse which incapacitated him for the rest of the season. Carmichael took over as captain.

SoCon Tournament
For their play in the Southern Conference tournament, the Atlanta sportswriters dubbed the North Carolina team the "white phantoms", a nickname which stuck for years.

On February 29, 1924, UNC beat Kentucky, 41–20, in the first-ever game of the Kentucky–North Carolina rivalry.  Kentucky's star player James McFarland had been a high school All-American. Cobb and Carmichael combined for 31 points, "and easily poured in enough shots from long distance to win the game".

On March 1, UNC won 37–20 over a Vanderbilt team coached by Josh Cody and led by Pep Bell. Cobb scored 17. 

In the semifinals, UNC defeated the defending SoCon champion Mississippi A&M team led by K. P. Gatchell. A&M's H. G. Perkins, a good shooter from long-distance, played in the first half despite injuries to his ankle and hand, and could not finish the game. Carmichael and Cobb combined for 25 points.

And in the final, UNC beat Alabama 26–18, coached by Hank Crisp and led by Slim Carter. The game was considered close. "For the first time" since the start of the tournament "the Tarheel was laboring." Alabama was marred by foul trouble. They had two players foul out, and then Carter fouled out, leaving Alabama with only four players. "Captain Carmichael, of North Carolina, waived the rule and insisted on Carter's remaining in the game." Cobb scored 15.

Aftermath
The local news reported that hundreds of students at North Carolina "waited in the streets in front of telegraph offices and cafes" for news about the game and after the victory students "went wild" and set a bonfire on the athletic field. Some 500 students marched to Cobb's house in Durham and woke up the household with fight songs.

On March 4, The Tar Heel reported that Coach Shepard would be leaving in March for China to work as a representative for the Liggett and Myers Tobacco Company. His departure caused "a great deal of regret" for the student body. Monk McDonald was hired as head coach, and Jack Cobb was elected captain.

Carmichael and Cobb were retroactively named as All-Americans by the Helms Foundation at the Forward position for 1924.  The Helms Athletic Foundation retroactively named All-America teams for years 1905–35, and are considered the "official" teams of those years by the NCAA. Carmichael, Cobb, and Monk McDonald made the contemporary All-Southern Conference tournament team by sportswriter Morgan Blake.

In 1943, after spending six months researching material, the Helms Athletic Foundation named the team retroactive national champions. In 2009, the Premo-Porretta Power Poll added rankings for the 1895–96 through 1947–48 seasons, which also deemed the Tar Heels national champions for the 1923–24 season.

References

Footnotes

Citations

Bibliography

North Carolina Tar Heels men's basketball seasons
NCAA Division I men's basketball tournament championship seasons
North Carolina
North Carolina Tar Heels Men's Basketball Team
North Carolina Tar Heels Men's Basketball Team